Tommy McCall was a professional association footballer, who was a left winger.

Queen of the South
When McCall was with Dumfries club Queen of the South, he achieved the Scottish record for goalscoring in a season for his position. The left winger scored 32 goals in season 1932-33. Queens ended that particular league campaign with a 2–1 away victory over the division champions Hibernian, earning promotion to the top flight of Scottish football as the division's runners-up, with McCall scoring one of the goals in that match.

McCall is the ninth highest goalscorer in the Doonhamers history with 93 goals.

References

Association football wingers
Year of death missing
Year of birth missing
Queen of the South F.C. players
Scottish footballers